The Kennedys is a 2015  BBC One British sitcom written by British actress and comedian Emma Kennedy, about her eccentric childhood, on a Stevenage New Town estate, Jessop Square, in the 1970s.

Starring
Lucy Hutchinson as Emma Kennedy
Katherine Parkinson as Brenda Kennedy
Dan Skinner as Tony Kennedy
Harry Peacock as Tim
Emma Pierson as Jenny
Shola Adewusi as Dee Palmer
Clive Rowe as David Palmer

Episodes
Episode 1: Secret Whisper (2 October 2015)

Episode 2: Valentine (9 October 2015)

Episode 3: Vikings (16 October 2015)

Episode 4: JessOpportunity Knocks (23 October 2015)

Episode 5: Wedding (30 October 2015)

Episode 6: Camping (6 November 2015)

References

External links
 
 
 
http://www.theguardian.com/tv-and-radio/2015/oct/02/the-kennedys-review-70s-set-sitcom-stuffed-with-non-sequiturs
http://www.mirror.co.uk/tv/tv-previews/kennedys-katherine-parkinson-dan-skinner-6557258
http://www.chortle.co.uk/review/2015/10/02/23301/the_kennedys

2015 British television series debuts
2015 British television series endings
2010s British sitcoms
BBC television sitcoms
English-language television shows
Stevenage
Television series set in the 1970s
Television shows set in Hertfordshire